Lucier is a defunct European restaurant in Portland, Oregon. The business operated for seven months in 2008.

Description 
Lucier was a restaurant in south Portland's South Waterfront district. The menu included "modern European cuisine", according to Portland Monthly. Martin Cizmar described Lucier as "the most opulent restaurant space in Portland history". The interior featured a lazy river.

History 
The restaurant operated for seven months during 2008, and the space remained unoccupied until 2013. Willamette Week called the restaurant's short lifespan "the most colossal faceplant in Portland dining history".

Reception 
In 2008, Karen Brooks of The Oregonian gave the restaurant a rating of 'C–'. Wendy Culverwell of the Portland Business Journal wrote, "Lucier Restaurant opened and closed so quickly in 2008 that many people never had a chance to see its stunning setting." Lucier chef Pascal Chureau said criticism of the restaurant was "unfair". In his 2016 overview of "97 long-gone Portland restaurants we wish were still around", Grant Butler of The Oregonian wrote, "OK, this ridiculously extravagant waterfront restaurant may have been the biggest dining belly-flop in recent years, opening and closing in a matter of months in 2008. But those views of the Willamette! And those over-the-top Dale Chihuly sculptures, which were pretty magnificent when seen up close. The expensive food may have been a mess, but the desserts put pastry chef Kristen Murray on the map, and for that we are forever grateful."

References 

2008 disestablishments in Oregon
2008 establishments in Oregon
Defunct European restaurants in Portland, Oregon
Restaurants disestablished in 2008
Restaurants established in 2008